Westgate-on-Sea railway station is on the Chatham Main Line in England, serving the town of Westgate-on-Sea, Kent.

The station and all trains that serve the station are operated by Southeastern.

Services
All services at Westgate-on-Sea are operated by Southeastern  using  and  EMUs.

The typical off-peak service in trains per hour is:

 1 tph to  
 1 tph to 

The station is also served by a small number of High Speed services to London St Pancras International.

References

External links

Thanet
Railway stations in Kent
DfT Category E stations
Former London, Chatham and Dover Railway stations
Railway stations in Great Britain opened in 1871
Railway stations served by Southeastern